Bathanalia is a genus of tropical freshwater snails with an operculum, aquatic gastropod mollusks in the family Paludomidae.

This genus is endemic to the Lake Tanganyika.

Species
Species within the genus Bathanalia include:
 Bathanalia howesi (Moore, 1898) - type species
 Bathanalia straeleni Leloup, 1953

References

Further reading 
 Moore J. E. (1898). "Descriptions of the genera Bathanalia and Bythoceras, from Lake Tanganyika". Proceedings of the Malacological Society of London 3 : 92-93.

Paludomidae
Taxonomy articles created by Polbot